The Hong Kong women's national handball team is the national team of Hong Kong. It is governed by the Handball Association of Hong Kong and takes part in international handball competitions.

Asian Championship record
 1989 – 5th
 2015 – 8th
 2017 – 8th
 2018 – 7th
 2021 – 6th
 2022 – 9th

External links

IHF profile

Women's national handball teams
Hand
National team